"Siamese Kat" is the second studio album by thai pop singer Katreeya English, released by GMM Grammy on May, 2003.

Track listing
 "Meaw meaw" : เหมียว เหมียว
 "Seven days"
 "Kon kong muer wann" : คนของเมื่อวาน
 "Na na na wah gun pai" : นา นา นา ว่ากันไป
 "Rao mai kei plien" : เราไม่เคยเปลี่ยน
 "Noy noi" : น้อยหน่อย
 "Mai chai...plor tur" : ไม่ใช่...เพราะเธอ
 "Boob pay ar ra wad" : บุพเพอาละวาด
 "Tong karn ruk tae" : ต้องการรักแท้
 "Bye bye" (cover version)
 "Kid tueng luer ngao jai" : คิดถึงหรือเหงาใจ
 "Meaw meaw" (minus one)

External links
 International Fan Site
 Konrakkat.com

2003 albums